Nephilingis borbonica is an araneid spider from Réunion. It was once thought to also inhabit Madagascar and other nearby islands, however these were determined in 2011 to be a different species, Nephilingis livida, while specimens from Mauritius were placed in the new species Nephilingis dodo.

Anatomy

Female

The color of the abdomen ranges from striking bright red to whitish-red, with larger specimens displaying a brighter red. Total length ranges from about 14 to 22mm.

Male

Males' total length ranges from about 4 to 6 mm. They have a yellow-brown prosoma, and a gray abdomen with white pigment dots.

Distribution
N. borbonica occurs in Réunion, and were observed in cloud forests at up to 1,500 m elevation .

Name

The species name borbonica refers to the island Réunion near Madagascar, which was called "Bourbon" until 1848.

References

External links

Araneidae
Spiders of Réunion
Spiders described in 1863